The Friendship Four is an annual mid-season college ice hockey tournament that has been held since 2015 at SSE Arena Belfast in Belfast, Northern Ireland with the winner receiving the Belpot Trophy. It is currently the only college ice hockey tournament to take place outside of the United States.

History
The tournament began as a way to foster stronger economic development, trade and investment, tourism, cultural exchange and educational linkages between the sister cities of Boston and Belfast. Each year four teams are selected to participate in the tournament which it typically held on the same weekend as Thanksgiving in the United States. As of 2019 all games have been played at the SSE Arena Belfast while all participating schools have come from the eastern region. While only two participating universities have come from Boston, many more have come from the same General Region.

After the 2020 and 2021 series were cancelled due to the COVID-19 pandemic, the 2022 Friendship Four was announced on December 4, 2021.

Yearly Results

References

External link
 

Annual sporting events in the United Kingdom
Recurring sporting events established in 2015
2015 establishments in Northern Ireland
Ice hockey in the United Kingdom
College ice hockey tournaments in the United States